Neoclassical realism is a theory of international relations and an approach to foreign policy analysis. Initially coined by Gideon Rose in a 1998 World Politics review article, it is a combination of classical realist and neorealist – particularly defensive realist – theories.

Neoclassical realism holds that the actions of a state in the international system can be explained by intervening systemic variables, such as the distribution of power capabilities among states; cognitive variables, such as the perception and misperception of systemic pressures, other states' intentions, or threats; and domestic variables, such as state institutions, elites, and societal actors that affect the power and freedom of action of the foreign policy decision-makers.

Overview 
While holding true to the realist concept of balance of power, neoclassical realism further adds that states' mistrust and inability to perceive one another accurately, or state leaders' inability to mobilize state power and public support, can result in imbalances within the international system, the rise and fall of great powers, and war. There are four variations of power balance:

 Appropriate balancing occurs when a state correctly perceives another state's intentions and balances accordingly.
 Inappropriate balancing or overbalancing occurs when a state incorrectly perceives another state as threatening, and uses more resources than it needs to in order to balance. This causes an imbalance.
 Underbalancing occurs when a state fails to balance, out of either inefficiency or incorrectly perceiving a state as less of threat than it actually is. This causes an imbalance.
 Nonbalancing occurs when a state avoids balancing through buck passing, bandwagoning, or other escapes. A state may choose to do this for a number of reasons, including an inability to balance.
According to Nicholas Ross Smith of University of Nottingham Ningbo China, Neoclassical realism has primarily been criticized for its "apparent ontological and epistemological incoherence". A 1995 study criticized Neoclassical realism for encompassing "nearly the entire universe of international relations theory" and stretching realism "beyond all recognition or utility." According to Stephen Walt of the Kennedy School at Harvard University, one of the chief flaws in Neoclassical realism is that it "tends to incorporate domestic variables in an ad hoc manner, and its proponents have yet to identify when these variables have greater or lesser influence".

Neoclassical realism has been used to explain a number of puzzling foreign policy cases, such as the volatility in South Korea-Japan relations, Fascist Italy's foreign policy, Slobodan Milosevic's decision-making during the 1999 Kosovo crisis, the occurrence of the Cod Wars between Iceland and the United Kingdom, and Iran's foreign policy choices after the American invasions of Afghanistan and Iraq. Proponents of the theory argue that the theory is particularly valuable in explaining cases that fly in the face of other international relations theories, due to its incorporation of domestic variables.

Notable neoclassical realists
Persons mentioned as neoclassical realists, and the year of the release of the work associated with this classification include:

 Jack Snyder (1991)
 William Wohlforth (1993)
 Thomas J. Christensen (1996)
 Jennifer Sterling-Folker (1997)
 Gideon Rose (1998)
 Randall Schweller (1998)
 Fareed Zakaria (1998)
 Robert Jervis (1999)
 Anders Wivel (2005)
 Colin Dueck (2006)
 Jeffrey Taliaferro (2006)
 Norrin Ripsman (2009)
 Steven Lobell (2009)
 Asle Toje (2010)
 Tom Dyson (2010)
 Nicholas Kitchen (2010)
Yan Xuetong (2011)
 Robert Wishart (2013)
 Michiel Foulon (2015)
 Elias Götz (2019)
 Henrik Larsen (2019) 
 Gustav Meibauer (2020)

See also
War termination

References

Further reading

Christensen, Thomas. Useful Adversaries: Grand Strategy, Domestic Mobilization, and Sino-American Conflict, 1947-1958 (Princeton: University Press, 1996)
 Dyson, Tom. "Neoclassical Realism and Defence Reform in Post-Cold War Europe" (Basingstoke: Palgrave Macmillan, 2010)
Foulon, Michiel, 2015. "Neoclassical Realism: Challengers and Bridging Identities". International Studies Review.
Götz, Elias, 2021. "Neoclassical Realist Theories, Intervening Variables, and Paradigmatic Boundaries". Foreign Policy Analysis.
Kitchen, Nicholas. ‘Systemic Pressures and Domestic Ideas: A Neoclassical Realist Model of Grand Strategy Formation’, Review of International Studies, 36 no. 1 (2010), 117-143.
Lobell, Steven E.; Ripsman, Norrin M. and Taliaferro, Jeffrey W. (eds.) Neoclassical Realism, the State, and Foreign Policy(Cambridge: University Press, 2009)
Meibauer, Gustav, 2020."Interests, Ideas and the Study of State Behaviour in Neoclassical Realism." Review of International Studies.
Meibauer, Gustav, Linde Desmaele, Tudor Onea, Nicholas Kitchen, Michiel Foulon, Alexander Reichwein, Jennifer Sterling-Folker, 2020. "Forum: Rethinking Neoclassical Realism at Theory's End." International Studies Review.
Rose, Gideon. "Neoclassical Realism and Theories of Foreign Policy," World Politics, 51 (October 1998), pp. 144–172
Smith, Nicholas Ross. "Can Neoclassical Realism Become a Genuine Theory of International Relations?," The Journal of Politics 2018
Schweller, Randall. "Unanswered Threats: Political Constraints on the Balance of Power (Princeton: University Press, 2006)
Sterling-Folker, Jennifer, 1997. "Realist Environment, Liberal Process, and Domestic-Level Variables". International Studies Quarterly.
Toje, Asle and Kunz, Barbara (eds.) Neoclassical Realism in European Politics: Bringing Power Back In (Manchester: University Press, 2012)
William Wohlforth. The Elusive Balance: Power and Perceptions during the Cold War (Ithaca: Cornell University Press, 1993) 
Zakaria, Fareed. From Wealth to Power: The Unusual Origins of America's World Role (Princeton: University Press, 1998)

International relations
Political realism